"Cycles" (stylized as "cycles" on the tracklist) is a song by Swedish singer-songwriter Tove Lo, from her third studio album, Blue Lips. It was released on 17 November 2017 as a promotional single. It was written by Tove Lo, Joe Janiak, Ludvig Söderberg and produced by The Struts. Lyrically, it talks about being trapped in a never-ending relationship loop. A music video directed by Malia James was released on 4 December 2018.

Composition
"Cycles"  is a three-minute, twenty-eight-second synth-pop song, written by Tove Lo, Joe Janiak, Ludvig Söderberg and produced by The Sturts. Written in the key of G major, "Cycles" has a tempo of 105 beats per minute and features "baby-cry production, is dripping with self-deprecation." Lyrically, the song is about being trapped in a never-ending relationship loop, indicated by the lines: "How can I change it when I don't know when I'm in it?/ I'm in a cycle/ Swear this is different/ Don't wanna end it/ If you leave then I keep spinnin'". According to Xavier Piedra from Billboard she "sings in the chorus while she holds her head in frustration."

Critical reception
Danny Madion of The Michigan Daily wrote that the song "walks listeners through a narrative of falling in love with an ex-lover. It's sad and earnest but doesn't lead to a notable chorus you’d sing in the car.". Alex Clarke of The Observer described "Cycles" and "Stranger" as "honest depictions of love that are nothing in the way of cliché."

Music video
The music video for "Cycles" was directed by Malia James and it was released on 4 December 2018 on her Vevo channel. It was filmed as a one-shot and it was initially previewed in her short film Blue Lips in the post-credits scene where she spins around in a chair while the camera circles around her in blurry motion while lights are flashing all over her body.

Credits and personnel
Credits adapted from Tidal.
 Tove Lo − vocals, songwriter
 Ludvig Söderberg − songwriter
 Joe Janiak − songwriter
 Jakob Jerlström − songwriter, backing vocalist
 The Struts − producer, programmer
 Chris Gehringer − mastering engineer
 John Hanes − assistant mixer
 Serban Ghenea − mixer

Charts

References

External links
 

2017 songs
Songs written by Tove Lo
Tove Lo songs
Songs written by Ludvig Söderberg
Songs written by Joe Janiak
Songs written by Jakob Jerlström